A Super Over, also called a one-over eliminator or officially a one over per side eliminator, is a tie-breaking method used in limited-overs cricket matches, where both teams play a single, additional over of six balls to determine the winner of the match. A match which goes to a Super Over is officially declared a "tie", and won by the team who score the most runs in the Super Over. If the Super Over also ends in a tie, it is followed by another Super Over. Previously, the winner was typically decided by the number of boundaries scored throughout the match.

History
A Super Over was first used in 2008 in Twenty20, replacing the bowl-out method that was previously used for breaking a tie match. The Super Over was introduced into One Day International (ODI) cricket at the 2011 Cricket World Cup, but it was left unused. For the following World Cup, only the final would be decided by a Super Over in the event of a tie. Ties in other knockout-stage matches returned to the previous rule where the team with the better group stage performance would advance. In 2017, the ICC instated Super Over in the knockout stages of that year's Women's Cricket World Cup and Champions Trophy. The 2019 Cricket World Cup Final marked the first ever ODI (One Day International) to be decided by a Super Over: after the two teams tied on runs in their Super Over, England was declared the winner over New Zealand through the controversial boundary count-back rule, which has since been replaced with the rules above.

Views on use
The Super Over is often used in the group stage of Twenty20 tournaments. Journalist Sambit Bal described this use as being unnecessary for situations outside knockout stages. He sees a tie being a satisfactory result both to the teams and in entertainment value. Former New Zealand coach Mike Hesson also criticised the practice after his team lost two matches by Super Overs in the Super Eight group stage of the 2012 ICC World Twenty20. After their loss of the 2019 Cricket World Cup final to England in a Super Over, New Zealand coach Gary Stead suggested that the ICC should have considered awarding the championship jointly to both teams rather than play a tiebreaker.

Rules
The International Cricket Council state the official rules for Super Overs in the Standard Twenty20 International Match Playing Conditions, in effect from 1 October 2012.

Each team selects three batsmen, with their Super Over innings ending if two of their batsmen get out. The team who batted second in the match bats first in the Super Over, while the bowling team chooses the end to bowl from. If the Super Overs of both teams also end in a tie, the original rules stated that the winner is determined by either the number of boundaries scored throughout the match and Super Over, the number of boundaries scored throughout the match but excluding the Super Over, or a count-back conducted from the last ball of the Super Over. If the Duckworth–Lewis method was used during the match, the Super Over immediately goes to the count-back criteria.

Earlier, Super Overs ending in a tie had the winner first decided by the number of boundary sixes the teams hit in both innings, then by the sixes hit in the main match.

After the tied Super Over in the 2019 Cricket World Cup Final, which England won on boundary count, the ICC was criticised by many former cricketers and numerous fans for the use of such a controversial tie-breaker. In October 2019, they changed the rule such that if a Super Over is tied in the group stage of a tournament then the match will be awarded as a tie, but in knockout matches, the Super Over will be repeated until a winner is determined. In any bilateral series match also the super over will be iterated until one team wins. Each consecutive Super Over is to take place 5 minutes after the previous Super Over, with the side batting last in the previous Super Over batting first in the subsequent Super Over, and any batsman dismissed in previous Super Overs being ineligible to bat.

Variations
In the 2014–15 season, the Big Bash League began using a variation of the rules, allowing each innings the full amount of 10 wickets.

Scoring
A Super Over is not considered part of the main match, so the runs scored and wickets taken by cricketers within them is not added to their career statistics.

Example

The first use of a Super Over was in the tied Twenty20 match between the West Indies and New Zealand on 26 December 2008. West Indies scored 25/1 in their Super Over and New Zealand replied with 15/2.

The 26 December 2008 Twenty20 match between New Zealand and the West Indies was tied after each side's 20 overs.

 - Daniel Vettori was the "nominated bowler" for New Zealand.
 - Chris Gayle and Xavier Marshall opened the "mini-innings".
 - Marshall was run out without facing a ball, and Shivnarine Chanderpaul similarly remained at the non-striker's end.
 - Gayle hit 25 runs off the 6 balls he faced.
The West Indies "Super Over" score was 25 for 1 from six balls.
 - Sulieman Benn was the nominated bowler for the West Indies.
 - NZ opener Jacob Oram was caught on Benn's third "Super Over" delivery. 
 - Third man in Ross Taylor hit a six but was then clean bowled on the next ball. Oram's "Super Over" opening partner Brendon McCullum didn't face a delivery.
The New Zealand Super Over score was 15 for 2 (all out) from five balls.
The West Indies thus won the Super Over.

International matches decided by a Super Over

Men's One Day International

† England won due to having more boundaries in the match (26–17).

Men's Twenty20 International

Women's One Day International

Women's Twenty20 International

See also
Bowl-out (cricket)
Penalty shoot-out (association football)
Extra innings (baseball)

References

External links
List of tied Twenty20 matches on ESPN Cricinfo
List of tied Twenty20 International matches on ESPN Cricinfo
Standard Twenty20 International Match Playing Conditions from the International Cricket Council

Limited overs cricket
Cricket terminology